Robert A. Henle (1923 – January 27, 1989) was an electrical engineer, who contributed to semiconductor technology.

In 1949, he received the BSEE degree from the University of Minnesota.

Henle joined the IBM where he became involved in semiconductor circuits for computers.

He was appointed an IBM Fellow in 1964. He was elected Fellow of the IEEE, was elected into the National Academy of Engineering, and received the IEEE Edison Medal  "For sustained leadership in, and individual contributions to, the science and technology of semiconductor circuits for computing systems."

References

External links
 IEEE Legacies

1923 births
1989 deaths
University of Minnesota College of Science and Engineering alumni
American electrical engineers
Fellow Members of the IEEE
Members of the United States National Academy of Engineering
IEEE Edison Medal recipients
IBM employees
IBM Fellows
20th-century American engineers